The M-Squared Breese is a large family of high-wing, strut-braced, pusher configuration, tricycle gear, ultralight aircraft produced by M-Squared Aircraft of St. Elmo, Alabama in kit form, for amateur construction.

Design and development
The M-Squared line of aircraft was started in 1996 when a former Quicksilver Manufacturing employee, Paul Mather, decided to offer retrofit kits to convert the Quicksilver II from cable-braced wings to a strut-braced configuration with jury struts. The kits proved popular and Mather expanded to market complete aircraft based on the basic Quicksilver layout. The first two aircraft in the series were the two-seat double surface wing Sport 1000 and the two-seat single surface wing Sprint 1000.

The series all share similar construction featuring a bolted aluminium tube structure with the flying surfaces covered in pre-sewn Dacron sailcloth envelopes. All models are open-cockpit, but some have optional streamlined pods available. All models use tricycle landing gear and steerable nosewheels.

The Breese 2 DS and SS have been accepted by the US Federal Aviation Administration as approved special light-sport aircraft.

Variants
Sport 1000
Two seats in side-by-side configuration, double surface sailcloth wing, based on the Quicksilver MX Sport II. The construction time from the assembly kit is reported as 75 hours. Standard engine is the  Rotax 582, with the  Rotax 912 optional. The now out-of-production  Rotax 618 was at one time an optional engine, as well. Other options include streamlined cockpit pod, wheel pants and extra fuel tankage. In production.
Sprint 1000
Two seats in side-by-side configuration, designed for the US experimental amateur-built category,  Rotax 582 two-stroke powerplant,  gross weight, single surface sailcloth wing. In production.
Sprint 1000 FP
Two-seat amphibious floatplane designed for the US experimental amateur-built category,  Rotax 912ULS four-stroke powerplant,  gross weight, single surface sailcloth wing, 1650 Full Lotus floats. In production.
Breese XL
Single-seat aircraft designed for the US FAR 103 Ultralight Vehicles category,  Hirth F33 two-stroke or the  Revolution Rotary 301 powerplant,  gross weight, single surface sailcloth wing. In production.

Breese 2 SS
Two-seat aircraft designed for the US light-sport aircraft category,  Rotax 582 two-stroke powerplant,  gross weight, single surface sailcloth wing. In production.

Breese 2 DS
Two-seat aircraft designed for the US light-sport aircraft category,  Rotax 582 two-stroke powerplant,  gross weight, double surface sailcloth wing. In production.
Breese DS
Single-seat aircraft designed for the US experimental amateur-built aircraft category,  Rotax 447 or  Rotax 503 two-stroke powerplant,  gross weight, double surface sailcloth wing. In production.
Breese SS
Single-seat aircraft designed for the US experimental amateur-built aircraft category,  Rotax 447 or   Rotax 503 two-stroke powerplant,  gross weight, double surface sailcloth wing. In production.
Ultra-X
Single-seat aircraft designed for the US experimental amateur-built aircraft category,  Rotax 680 two-stroke powerplant,  gross weight, double surface sailcloth wing, with a symmetrical airfoil. In production.
American Tugz
Single-seat aircraft designed for the US experimental amateur-built aircraft category,  Rotax 680 two-stroke powerplant,  gross weight, single surface sailcloth wing, designed for towing hang gliders aloft. In production.

Specifications (Sport 1000)

References

External links

1990s United States ultralight aircraft
Light-sport aircraft